Lasarus Ratuere (born 30 June 1985) is an Australian actor. He is known for his portrayal of Ishikawa, a member of Section 9, in the DreamWorks and Paramount Pictures feature film adaptation Ghost in the Shell.

Biography
Ratuere was born on 30 June 1985 in Adelaide, South Australia, Australia to Fijian parents, Lasarus grew up in Brisbane, Queensland. Graduating from the Performing Arts Conservatory in 2012, Lasarus graced Australian screens in the world war epic The Digger, then made his American television debut in Steven Spielberg's and 20th Century Fox's sci-fi Terra Nova. He progressed on as Malcolm Mabo in the social and politically motivated biopic drama Mabo, co-starred in the comedy feature film The Mule and starred as a lead character in the hugely successful award-winning series Ready For This. Lasarus more recently appears in season 3 of The Leftovers and is attached to star in a British SAS feature film with the working title Mirbat. 

His first Sydney theatre role was at Belvoir St Theatre in the Australian play called Kill the Messenger. This led to a Helpmann Award
nomination for his critically acclaimed performance as the troubled lad Paul Witt.

Filmography

Film

Television

References

External links 
 
 
 

1985 births
Australian male film actors
Living people
Australian people of Fijian descent
Australian male television actors
21st-century Australian male actors
Charles Sturt University alumni
Male actors from Adelaide
Male actors from Brisbane